The  Diocese of Belleville is a Latin Church ecclesiastical territory or diocese of the Catholic Church in the southern Illinois region of the United States.  It comprises the southern counties of the state of Illinois and the See city for the diocese is the City of Belleville. It is a suffragan see in the ecclesiastical province of the metropolitan Archdiocese of Chicago.  The cathedral parish for the diocese is the Cathedral of Saint Peter.  Following the resignation of Edward Braxton on April 3, 2020, Michael G. McGovern was installed as the current Bishop of Belleville.

History

Early history 
During the 17th century, present day Illinois was part of the French colony of New France. The Diocese of Quebec, which had jurisdiction over the colony, sent numerous French missionaries to the region. Reverend Claude-Jean Allouez was stationed at Kaskaskia, Illinois, for eight weeks from early June to the middles of August 1673, before returning to St. Francis Xavier Mission near Green Bay, Wisconsin. 

Illinois has some of the oldest catholic churches in the American Midwest. The records of the church of Kaskaskia, dating back to 1695, name Reverend Jacques Gravier as the missionary priest. French missionaries opened the Cahokia mission of Holy Family in 1699. At that time, the Catholics of Cahokia and the surrounding territory, including the city of St. Louis across the river, were attended to by Father De Saintpierre.

The organization of the congregation of Prairie du Rocher, Illinois coincides with the building of the first Fort de Chartres on the Mississippi River in 1720. Reverend Jen Le Boullenger, chaplain of the militia stationed at the Fort, was placed in charge of the congregation. The mission church was dedicated to St. Anne. In 1743, the Rev. J. Gagnon took charge of the mission, serving there until his death in 1755. His remains were interred alongside the altar in the chapel in the mission cemetery. This chapel was built in 1734, and dedicated to St. Joseph. In 1768, Reverend Pierre Gibault was appointed vicar general of the Archdiocese of Quebec for the Illinois area, now part of the British Province of Quebec. 

In 1776. the Illinois area was claimed by the new United States. In 1785, Archbishop John Carroll  sent his first missionary to Illinois, which became part of the Northwest Territory in 1787. With the creation of the Diocese of Bardstown in Kentucky in 1810, supervision of the Illinois missions shifted there. In 1827, the new bishop of the Diocese of St. Louis assumed jurisdiction over the new state of Illinois. In 1834, the Vatican erected the Diocese of Vincennes, which included both Indiana and Illinois.

When the Diocese of Chicago was erected in 1843, it included the entire state of Illinois. in 1857, Pope Pius IX erected the new Diocese of Alton in Alton Illinois, transferring all of southern Illinois from the Diocese of Chicago.

Diocese of Belleville 
The Diocese of Belleville was created on January 7, 1887 by Pope Leo XIII.  Its territory was taken from the Diocese of Alton. The first bishop of the new diocese was Reverend John Janssen of the Diocese of Alton, appointed by the pope in 1888. By 1902, the diocese contained 104 churches, 94 priests, 64 parochial schools and 50,000 Catholics.In 1903, at Janssen's request, the Poor Handmaids of Christ religious order set up a hospital in East St. Louis, Illinois.  The hospital was open to all patients, regardless of race or religion. Janssen died in 1913.

Pope Pius X appointed Reverend Henry J. Althoff as bishop of Belleville in 1913 to replace Janssen. In July 1927. Atholl banned female parishioners from receiving communion if they were wearing makeup, sleeveless tops or low-cut tops. In 1937, Althoff forbade church-sponsored gambling in the diocese, encouraging Catholics to support their parishes by direct contribution rather than parish parties and festivals. Later that year, he banned dancing the night before a holy day.  Since New Years Day was a holy day, that meant no dancing on New Years Eve. 

Althoff died in 1947 after a 20 year tenure as bishop. Pope Pius XII named Reverend Albert Zuroweste as the next bishop of Belleville. In 1969, Zuroweste became embroiled in a racial dispute in Cairo, Illinois.  He had sent the Reverend Gerald Montroy to Cairo in 1968 to minister to the poor and to African-Americans.  After meeting with the local pastor, Montroy became convinced that the pastor had no desire to welcome African-Americans to his parish.  In response, Montroy reopened St. Columba, a shuttered mission in Cairo, and started holding masses there for African-American Catholics.  He also provided facilities for Black Power activists looking to challenge racial discrimination in that city.  Zuroweste came under pressure from Cairo to recall Montroy, but gave him qualified support after demands from progressive Catholic organizations.  After several shooting incidents, Montroy accused a local white group of vigilantism and the local pastor of trying to oust him.

In December 1971, Zuroweste excommunicated Bernard Bodewes, a diocesan priest he had sent to Cairo to help Montroy.  Bodewes had sued Zuroweste for $7,350 in damages for withholding his pay since January 1st.  Bodewes said that Zuroweste had withheld the pay because he was angry over Bodewes' support of Montroy's initiatives in Cairo. By 1972, Zuroweste took action to evict Montroy and the organizations working in Saint Columba.

When Zuroweste retired in 1977, Pope Paul VI named Auxiliary Bishop William Cosgrove of the Diocese of Cleveland. as the next bishop of Belleville. Cosgrove served until his retirement in 1981.  Pope John Paul II replaced Zurowete that same year with Reverend John Wurm from the Archdiocese of St. Louis.  Wurm died three years later.  John Paul II then appointed James Patrick Keleher of the Archdiocese of Chicago as the new bishop of Belleville.  In 1993, the pope named Keleher archbishop of St. Louis.Auxiliary Bishop Wilton Gregory of the Archdiocese of Chicago was appointed by John Paul II as bishop of the Diocese of Belleville in 1993. In 2004, the pope named him as archbishop of the Archdiocese of Atlanta.

The current bishop of Belleville is Michael G. McGovern from the Archdiocese of Chicago, appointed by Pope Francis in 2020. In July 2022, McGovern announced the planned sale of the diocesan bishop's residence and his move to a more modest space in the Cathedral of St. Peter rectory.  The money from the sale, he announced, would be used to subsidize various ministries and charities, including the establishment of a fund benefiting expectant mothers and children.

Sexual abuse 
During a 2008 lawsuit against the Diocese of Belleville, information was revealed about Bishop Zuroweste's treatment of a child abuser priest.  In 1973 Gina Parks, a 16 year-old parishioner in St. Francisville, Illinois, told diocesan officials that her parish priest, Raymond Kownacki, had raped and impregnated her.  Kownacki also encouraged Parks to have an abortion. After hearing her story, Zuroweste did not report the allegations to the police or initiate an investigation.  Instead, he transferred Kownacki several months later to St. Theresa Parish in Salem, Illinois, without any restrictions.  By 1982, allegations surfaced that Kownacki was sexually abusing young boys at St. Theresa, resulting in the 2008 lawsuit.

On October 27, 2020, Bishop McGovern removed Reverend Anthony Onyango from his position as administrator for two parishes, citing an allegation of "inappropriate behavior" with a minor.

Bishops

Bishops of Belleville
John Janssen (1888–1913)
Henry J. Althoff (1913–1947)
Albert Rudolph Zuroweste (1947–1976)
William Michael Cosgrove (1976–1981)
John Nicholas Wurm (1981–1984)
James Patrick Keleher (1984–1993), appointed Archbishop of Kansas City in Kansas
Wilton Daniel Gregory (1993–2004), appointed Archbishop of Atlanta
Edward Kenneth Braxton (2005–2020)
Michael McGovern (2020–Present)

Auxiliary bishop
 Stanley Girard Schlarman (1979-1983), appointed Bishop of Dodge City

Other priest of this diocese who became Bishop
 Joseph Henry Leo Schlarman, appointed Bishop of Peoria in 1930 and subsequently named archbishop ad personam

High schools
 Althoff Catholic High School, Belleville
 Gibault Catholic High School, Waterloo
 Mater Dei High School, Breese

Summer camps
Camp Ondessonk

See also
 Pierre-Gabriel Marest, missionary at Kaskaskia

References

External links 

 Roman Catholic Diocese of Belleville Official Site

 
Belleville
Belleville
Religious organizations established in 1887
Belleville, Illinois
Belleville
1887 establishments in Illinois